The Fortress of Al-Ukhaidir or Abbasid palace of Ukhaider is located roughly 50 km south of Karbala, Iraq.  It is a large, rectangular fortress erected in 775 AD with a unique defensive style. Constructed by the Abbasid caliph As-Saffah's nephew Isa ibn Musa, Ukhaidir represents Abbasid architectural innovation in the structures of its courtyards, residences and mosque. Excavations at Ukhaidir were conducted in the early 20th century by Gertrude Bell, who wrote the first major report on the remains. Ukhaidir was an important stop on regional trade routes, similar to Atshan and Mujdah. The complex comprises a primary hall, a large Iwan, a reception hall and servants quarters.  The fortress exemplifies Abbasid architecture in Iraq by demonstrating the "despotic and the pleasure-loving character of the dynasty" in its grand size but cramped living quarters.

The current name could be related to Isma'il ibn Yusuf al-Ukhaidhir from Banu Ukhaidhir who launched a rebellion against the Abbasid, then later he became the governor of Kufa with the support of Qarmatians.

World Heritage Status 
This site was added to the UNESCO World Heritage Tentative List on July 7, 2000, in the Cultural category.

Gallery

Notes

References 
Ukhaidir (Iraq) - About.com Accessed 2009-09-25.
 Hillenbrand, R (1999), Islamic Art and Architecture, Thames and Hudson, 1999. 

Buildings and structures completed in 775
World Heritage Sites in Iraq
Karbala Governorate
Military history of the Abbasid Caliphate
Abbasid architecture
Abbasid palaces
Castles in Iraq
Palaces in Iraq
Lakhmids